Orocrambus clarkei is a moth in the family Crambidae. It was described by Alfred Philpott in 1930. This species is endemic to New Zealand. It is known from Mount Moltke, Minaret Peak, Homer Saddle and the Humboldt Range.

The wingspan is 20–26 mm. Adults have been recorded on wing from December to January.

Subspecies
Orocrambus clarkei clarkei (Mount Moltke, Minaret Peak)
Orocrambus clarkei eximia (Salmon, 1946) (Homer Saddle, Humboldt Range)

References

Crambinae
Moths described in 1930
Moths of New Zealand
Endemic fauna of New Zealand
Endemic moths of New Zealand